InterAccess is a Canadian artist-run centre and electronic media production facility in Toronto. Founded in 1982 as Toronto Community Videotex, InterAccess is Ontario's only exhibition space devoted exclusively to technological media arts. The Centre for Contemporary Canadian Art places the founding of InterAccess as a key moment in both the history of Canadian electronic art but also within a timeline of developments in international art, science, technology and culture.

History
In 1983, InterAccess was incorporated as a not-for-profit, artist-run access centre, under the name Toronto Community Videotex (TCV). It provided artists access to the Telidon system, a precursor of the World Wide Web. The early conception of electronic art placed the organization within the production cooperative system in Canada. TCV's members created artworks which fell within the more systems-based notions of art production, rather than the beaux-arts aesthetic of the museum.  The name change to InterAccess in 1987 reflected a new focus on Macintosh graphics, multimedia production and a dial-up artists’ network (much like a Bulletin Board System, or BBS) known as Matrix.

InterAccess moved to a larger facility in 1995 allowing InterAccess to offer a gallery and production space that expanded its activities beyond simply access to multimedia production. The exhibitions began to emphasize the finished production and there was a particular focus on establishing an international presence for the centre. The exhibition Pandoras Box, a collaboration between InterAccess and Fylkingen New Music and Intermedia Art in Stockholm, Sweden in 2000, was billed as "the first international interactive encounter with art using remotely controlled robots."

In 2005, InterAccess moved to a renovated two-floor, three thousand square feet stand-alone building, allowing for more production space, a surround sound studio and a machine shop for constructing large-scale physical computing projects and installation.

The exhibition This must be the place: Vera Frenkel, David Rokeby, Nell Tenhaaf and Norman White was a reconsideration of the centre and as well the place of electronic art within art history. The four featured artists are pioneers in electronic and interactive art and have a history with InterAccess as both members and exhibitors.

In May 2006, InterAccess received a Canada Council Media Arts Commissioning Grant for The Networked City, a series of five outdoor interactive installations on Yonge Street in Toronto.

In Dec 2015, InterAccess announced that it had acquired Vector Festival, a game and new media art festival dedicated to showcasing creative media practices. Vector Festival was founded in 2013 as the “Vector Game Art & New Media Festival” by an independent group of artists and curators: Skot Deeming, Clint Enns, Christine Kim, and Katie Micak, who were later joined by Diana Poulsen and Martin Zeilinger.

In 2016 InterAccess presented Canada's first exhibition related to drones, Once Is Nothing: A Drone Art Exhibition, "an art show completely dedicated to the rise of these suddenly ubiquitous machines, one that raises questions about borders, surveillance, identity and place".

References

Notes

Further reading

 Bull, Hank. "Radio Art in a Gallery?" TDR Vol. 37, No. 1 (Spring, 1993): 161-166.
 Dick, Terence. "Controller: Artists Crack the Game Code." Border Crossings 25 No. 2 (June 2006): 113-14.
 Dowler, Kevin. "Interstitial Aesthetics and the Politics of Video at the Canada Council." Mirror Machine: Video and Identity. Janine Marchessault, ed. Toronto: YYZ Books, 1995. 35-50. 
 Herst, Beth. Pandora's Box. PAJ: A Journal of Performance and Art Vol. 24, No. 1, Intelligent Stages: Digital Art and Performance (Jan. 2002): 122-126.
 Hough, Robert. "Beyond the Gallery (Electronic Mail Art)." This Magazine Vol. 27, Iss. 4 (Nov. 1993): 15.
 Mann, Jeff. "The Matrix Artists' Network: An Electronic Community." Leonardo Vol. 24, No. 2, Connectivity: Art and Interactive Telecommunications (1991): 230-231.
 Schilling, Mark. "This must be the place: Vera Frenkel, David Rokeby, Nell Tenhaaf and Norman White." para-para- 022: Parachute Magazine No. 122 (April 2006), 7-8.
 Shaw, Nancy. "Cultural Democracy and Institutionalized Difference: Intermedia, Metro Media." Mirror Machine: Video and Identity. Janine Marchessault, ed. Toronto: YYZ Books, 1995. 26-34.

External links
Official website
Vector Festival Official website

Arts organizations established in 1982
Art museums and galleries in Ontario
Artist-run centres
Organizations based in Toronto
Culture of Toronto
Art galleries established in 1982
1982 establishments in Ontario